Lizzobangers is the debut studio album by American singer and rapper Lizzo. It was released on Totally Gross National Product on October 15, 2013. In 2014, it was re-released on Virgin Records.

Production
Lizzobangers is produced by Lazerbeak and Ryan Olson. Some beats on the album are taken from Lazerbeak's 2012 album Lava Bangers.

Release
The album was released on Totally Gross National Product on October 15, 2013. In 2014, it was re-released on Virgin Records.

In 2019, the album was removed from all streaming services and digital retailers, to aid in Lizzo's campaign for Best New Artist at the 62nd Annual Grammy Awards. A month after the ceremony on February 21, 2020, the album returned to streaming services.

Music videos
Music videos were created for "Batches & Cookies", "Faded", "Bus Passes and Happy Meals", and "Paris". Impose included the video for "Batches & Cookies" on the "Best Videos of 2013" list.

Critical reception

At Metacritic, which assigns a weighted average score out of 100 to reviews from mainstream critics, the album received an average score of 85, based on 5 reviews, indicating "universal acclaim".

Dylan Kilby of MusicOMH gave the album 4 stars out of 5, describing it as "a triumphant album by an extraordinary artist and woman, whose girl-empowering lyricism and social consciousness puts her at the top of the underground and alternative hip-hop community." Killian Fox of The Guardian gave the album 4 stars out of 5, saying: "At times joyfully nonsensical, Lizzo's stream-of-consciousness rhymes can also be lethally pointed."

Star Tribune placed the album at number 1 on the "Twin Cities Critics Tally 2013" list.

Track listing

Personnel
Credits adapted from the 2014 vinyl edition's liner notes.

 Lizzo – vocals, flute
 Cliff Rhymes – vocals
 Sophia Eris – vocals (on "Batches & Cookies")
 Lazerbeak – production
 Ryan Olson – production
 Plain Ole Bill – turntables
 Jake Hansen – guitar
 Jim Anton – bass guitar
 James Buckley – bass guitar
 Erica Burton – viola
 Nelson Devereaux – saxophone
 Joey Van Phillips – vibraphone, percussion
 BJ Burton – mixing
 Huntley Miller – mastering
 Garrett Born – photography
 Jeffrey Barr – logo
 Paper Tiger – layout
 Drew Christopherson – layout

References

External links
 

2013 debut albums
Lizzo albums
Albums produced by Lazerbeak
Totally Gross National Product albums
Alternative hip hop albums by American artists